Janina Päivänsäde Fry (née Frostell) (born 12 November 1973 in Helsinki) is Finnish pop singer and model. She hosted the show Bella on Finnish television channel Nelonen.

Her breakthrough was winning the "Maiden of Finland" beauty pageant in 1993 and getting to the semi-finals in Miss World the same year. She also has a singing career, although her records have not been particularly successful, despite efforts by her record company Sony BMG.

Fry gave birth to her first child, a daughter, Sophia on March 2007. The father of the child is Mark Fry, the director of marketing at Sony BMG in Finland. They had been dating for several years before marrying in the summer of 2007. In 2010 she gave birth to their second child Brandon. The family lived in Espoo, Finland, before they moved to Stockholm, Sweden, in 2021.

Discography
 House of Joy (1999) (as Janina)
 Impossible Love (2003)

Singles 
 A Little Change (Gonna Do It) (1998)
 Love Is / No One But You (1999)
 What Goes Around (1999)
 Like a Hurricane (2001)
 I'll Save My Tears (2002)
 Impossible Love (2003)
 Insanity (Why It Always Happens to Me) (2003)
 Honey Love (2003)
 Call Me (2003)

References

External links
 
 Bella show homepage

1973 births
Living people
Swedish-speaking Finns
Finnish female models
Miss World 1993 delegates
Finnish expatriates in Sweden
Models from Helsinki